Sovetsky is a rural locality (a settlement) in Butylitskoye Rural Settlement, Melenkovsky District, Vladimir Oblast, Russia. The population was 71 as of 2010. There are 3 streets.

Geography 
Sovetsky is located 31 km northwest of Melenki (the district's administrative centre) by road. Dobryatino is the nearest rural locality.

References 

Rural localities in Melenkovsky District